The following is a timeline of the history of Luxembourg City, Luxembourg.

Prior to 19th century

 963 - Castle built atop Bock cliffs by Siegfried of Luxembourg.
 987 - Church of the Redemption consecrated.
 1120 - Church of St. Peter built.
 1320 - Saint Michael's Church built (approximate date).
 1340
 New city fortifications constructed.
 Schobermesse (tent fair) begins.
 1390 - Public clock installed (approximate date).
 1443 - Burgundians under Philip the Good conquer city.
 1554 - Fire in Ville Haute.
 1563 - La Fontaine Castle construction begins.
 1572 - City Hall built.
 1603 - Collège des Jésuites founded.
 1606 - Neumünster Abbey built.
 1613 - Church of Notre Dame cornerstone laid.
 1623 - Capuchin monastery built.
 1644 - Tunnels built.
 1671 - Place d'Armes laid out (approximate date).
 1684 - French in power.
 1685 - Lambert Fortress built.
 1693 - Jean-Bernard Knepper becomes mayor.
 1697 - Spaniards in power per Treaty of Ryswick.
 1714 - Austrians in power.
 1732 - Fort Thüngen built.
 1784 - Château de Septfontaines built outside city (in Rollingergrund).
 1794 - November 22: Siege of Luxembourg by French forces begins.
 1795
 June 7: Siege of Luxembourg ends.
 City becomes préfecture of the Forêts département of the French First Republic.
 1798 - Municipal Library active.
 1800 - François Scheffer becomes mayor.

19th century

 1815 - Prussians in power per Treaty of Paris.
 1821 - Luxemburger Wochenblatt newspaper begins publication.
 1827 - Journal de la ville et du Grand-Duché de Luxembourg newspaper in publication.
 1833 - Roman Catholic diocese of Luxembourg established.
 1838 - City Hall (Hôtel de Ville) completed.
 1848 - Luxemburger Wort newspaper begins publication.
 1850 - Society of the Natural Sciences established.
 1855 - Pescatore Institute (charity) founded.
 1858 - Population: 13,129.
 1859 - Luxembourg railway station opens.
 1860 - Hall of the Chamber of Deputies.
 1861 - Viaduct built over Petrusse valley.
 1867
 Luxembourg Crisis.
 Fortress dismantled per Treaty of London.
 1868 - Royal-Grand Ducal Institute established.
 1872
 Municipal Park laid out.
 Pescatore Museum opens.
 1882 - Casino Bourgeois opens.
 1884 - William II monument erected in Place Guillaume II.
 1890 - City becomes part of independent Grand Duchy of Luxembourg.
 1892 - Museum of Natural History opens in Pfaffenthal.
 1894 - Émile Mousel becomes mayor.
 1895 - Ons Hemecht begins publication.

20th century

 1903 - Adolphe Bridge built.
 1904 - Alphonse Munchen becomes mayor.
 1905 - Population: 20,984.
 1906 - Conservatoire de Luxembourg founded.
 1910 - Cercle Municipal building inaugurated.
 1913 - Luxembourg railway station rebuilt.
 1914 - German occupation begins.
 1918 - German occupation ends.
 1919 - Football Club Amis des Sports Lëtzebuerg-Fëschmaart founded.
 1920
 Dommeldange, Eich, Hamm, Hollerich, and Rollingergrund  incorporated into city.
 Villa Louvigny built.
 1921 - Gaston Diderich becomes mayor.
 1923 - Gëlle Fra war memorial erected.
 1930s - Sandweiler Airport opens.
 1933 - Luxembourg Philharmonic Orchestra founded.
 1940
 May 10: German occupation begins.
 August 18: Volksdeutsche Bewegung rally held.
 1944
 September 10: German occupation ends.
 Luxembourg American Cemetery and Memorial established.
 December: City besieged by German V-3 cannon.
 1945 - January: City besieged by German V-3 cannon.
 1946 - Émile Hamilius becomes mayor.
 1952 - European Coal and Steel Community, European Commission, and European Court of Justice headquartered in city.
 1953 - European School of Luxembourg I established.
 1964 - Municipal Theatre built.
 1965 - Alcide de Gasperi Building constructed.
 1966 - Grand Duchess Charlotte Bridge opens.
 1968 - European Investment Bank headquarters relocates to Luxembourg.
 1970 - Colette Flesch becomes mayor.
 1973
 National Library of Luxembourg relocates to former Athénée building.
 Rugby Club Luxembourg formed.
 1975 - European Court of Auditors headquartered in city.
 1976 - Municipal Hospital opens.
 1979 -  begins publication.
 1982
 Lydie Polfer becomes mayor.
 St. Peter and Paul Church consecrated.
 1984
 Photothèque opens.
 Hilton Luxembourg hotel built.
 1991 - BGL Luxembourg Open tennis tournament begins.
 1993 - Am Tunnel art gallery opens.
 1994
  opens.
 European Investment Fund headquartered in city.
 1995
 City designated a European Capital of Culture.
 Den Atelier music venue opens.
 1996
 Luxembourg City History Museum founded.
 Utopolis Kirchberg cinema multiplex (since renamed Kinepolis Kirchberg) and Casino Luxembourg open.
 1999 - Paul Helminger becomes mayor.

21st century

 2001
 City website online (approximate date).
 Lycée Aline Mayrisch established.
 2002 - National Museum of History and Art building expands.
 2004 - Football Club FC RM Hamm Benfica formed.
 2005
 Philharmonie Luxembourg concert hall opens.
 Racing Football Club Union Luxembourg formed.
 2006 - Grand Duke Jean Museum of Modern Art inaugurated.
 2008 - Judiciary City inaugurated.
 2010 - Villeroy & Boch porcelain factory closes.
 2011
 Xavier Bettel becomes mayor.
 Population: 94,034.

See also
 Quarters of Luxembourg City
 List of mayors of Luxembourg City
 History of Luxembourg (country)
 Years in Luxembourg (country)

References

This article incorporates information from the French Wikipedia, German Wikipedia, and Luxembourgish Wikipedia.

Bibliography

External links

 

 
Luxembourg
Luxembourg city
Luxembourg City